Seneca Creek is a  stream in Montgomery County, Maryland, USA, roughly  northwest of Washington, D.C. It drains into the Potomac River.

Course
The creek begins with two main tributaries:

These tributaries converge near Darnestown. Another major tributary, Dry Seneca Creek, empties into Seneca Creek west of Darnestown. The creek continues south and passes under Seneca Aqueduct/Riley's Lock (Lock 24) of the Chesapeake and Ohio (C&O) Canal before it flows into the Potomac River. There is about a  change in elevation from the stream's upper sources to its mouth at the Potomac.

Recreation

Depending on conditions, parts of the creek are navigable by light watercraft, such as kayaks or canoes. Near Riley’s Lock there is a boat ramp into the creek which provides access to the Potomac River.

An area of about  along  of the creek has been set aside as Seneca Creek State Park. It has trails including the  Seneca Creek Greenway Trail, the  Schaeffer Farm Trail, and many shorter and easier trails. Parking and picnic areas are provided at various locations in the park. Long Draught Creek, a small tributary north of Gaithersburg has been dammed to form the  Clopper Lake which is the centerpiece of the park's day use area. This area includes multiple picnic areas, a disc golf course, boat rentals for the lake, and restroom facilities.

History
Just west of the creek's mouth is the Seneca Quarry, the quarry that provided the red sandstone for the Smithsonian Castle and locks 8 - 27 of the C&O Canal. The remains of the 1837 stone cutting mill are still intact, though unmarked; above the quarry is the restored quarry masters house. Both are within state park lands.

During the 1920s and 1930s Seneca was a popular vacation spot for people from lower Montgomery County and Washington who came for the cooler temperatures, boating, swimming, and fishing.  There was a hotel near the canal and cottages lined the creek until they were washed away or destroyed by the several floods that have affected this area.  Unfortunately Seneca has been the site of many drownings and boating accidents over the years.  Today the area is a popular local recreation area.

See also
List of Maryland rivers
Locks on the C&O Canal

References

External links 

USGS Current Conditions for the Nation: Seneca Creek — U.S. Geological Survey
Seneca Creek State Park — Maryland Department of Natural Resources
The Great Seneca Creek Watershed — Montgomery County Department of Environmental Protection
WAMU 88.5 FM Metro Connection, From Stone to Bright Red Structure: A Tour of the Seneca Quarry, March 30, 2012.

Rivers of Montgomery County, Maryland
Rivers of Maryland
Tributaries of the Potomac River